A list of Portuguese films that were first released in 2000.

See also
2000 in Portugal

References

2000
Lists of 2000 films by country or language
2000 in Portugal